West Square is a historic square in south London, England, just south from St George's Road. The square is within the London Borough of Southwark, but as it is located in postcode SE11, it is commonly said to be in Lambeth.

Location
Immediately to the west is the Imperial War Museum (formerly the Bethlem Royal Hospital). To the south is the Imperial War Museum Annex (which used to be an orphans' home) in Austral Street.

The terraced houses in the square surround a communal garden that is open to the public during the day but locked at night. The square forms part of a larger conservation area.

History
West Square has the following entry in Volume XXV of the Survey of London, published in 1955 by the then London County Council.

In the 1800s, the square was used to house some staff at the Bethlehem Royal Hospital (now the Imperial War Museum). In addition, there were Steward's Quarters in the north-east corner of the Hospital grounds. King Edward's Schools (closed and demolished in the 1930s) occupied the eastern side, together with an area of drying posts. The whole eastern side of the old Hospital grounds is now given over to sports facilities.

J. A. R. Newlands (1837–1898), the Victorian chemist who discovered the Periodic Law for the chemical elements, was born and raised in No. 19. A blue plaque, installed by the Royal Society of Chemistry, commemorates Newlands on the front of the house.

Charlotte Sharman (1832-1929), a Christian Congregational church philanthropist, founded a girls' orphanage, on May 6, 1867, on West Square, in a rented house next-door to her parents' house. By 1871, Sharman had expanded her operations to include a nursery branch at 32 West Square, one for 5-8 year olds at 23 West Square, an infirmary at 44 West Square and a large house known as The Mansion at 14 South Street (now Austral Street), which housed 93 residents. Through donations from her communities, Sharman was able to purchase the site of 14 South Street (now Austral Street) and between 1875 and 1884, a new orphanage was built, known as the Orphans' Nest. Sharman opened a number of orphanages around the country, including Gravesend, Newton Abbott, Tunbridge Wells and Hastings. The Orphans' Nest in Southwark was used as a girls' orphanage until 1929/30, when the orphanage moved to Newlands Park, Sydenham. Charlotte Sharman died on 5 December 1929, aged 97. The orphanage building on Austral Street (formerly South Street) was purchased and became All Saints' Hospital and then, in the late 1980s, was purchased by the Imperial War Museums as the All Saints Annexe, to house staff offices, archive stores and a public reading room. In 2020, the former All Saints Annexe was being redeveloped as a studio for EPR Architects, with a scheduled completion date for February 2022.

In 1884–5, the Charlotte Sharman School was built on the north-west side, named after its founder, a Christian philanthropist. Construction of the school — which is still located there — required the demolition of some thirty houses. Part of the site is now occupied by the Siobhan Davies Dance Centre.

As a young child, Charlie Chaplin (1889–1977) lived at 39 West Square for a short period. He later recalled:

At the end of the 19th century, the garden in the square was threatened with building development, but there was a campaign to keep it. In 1909, the freehold was bought for some £4,000 by the London County Council and the Metropolitan Borough of Southwark. They enlarged and restored the garden, which was then opened for public use in 1910. The Metropolitan Public Gardens Association's landscape gardener Madeline Agar laid out the gardens and restored the earlier 1813 cruciform layout. The square was scheduled to protect it under the London Squares Preservation Act 1931. However, after the Second World War, it was proposed that the buildings should be demolished and the area added to Geraldine Mary Harmsworth Park. This was blocked by the Civic Amenities Act 1967 and instead the square became a conservation area.

The terrace of five houses in the north-west corner of the square were demolished c1970, and replaced by modern town houses designed to blend in with the original Georgian architecture (the corner house had at one point been converted into a pub, The City Arms). The west side of the square was also much-altered, with pairs of houses being run together to create four lateral flats in each property. In 1997–8, and with the exception of numbers 10 and 11, the terrace was reconverted to single houses. Overall, the square remains largely intact and of historic interest, a fact reflected in the 1972 Grade II listing of the east, south and wide sides.

See also 
 Lorrimore Square, also in Southwark

References

External links 
 A Short History of London's Garden Squares: 1900 to 1950
 A Walk through Lambeth and Southwark
 West Square Conservation Area Appraisal (Microsoft Word document)

1791 establishments in England
Squares in the London Borough of Lambeth
Squares in the London Borough of Southwark